The 2016 Louisiana–Lafayette Ragin' Cajuns softball team represented the University of Louisiana at Lafayette in the 2016 NCAA Division I softball season. The Ragin' Cajuns played their home games at Lamson Park and were led by sixteenth year head coach Michael Lotief.

Preseason

Sun Belt Conference Coaches Poll
The Sun Belt Conference Coaches Poll was released on January 26, 2016. Louisiana-Lafayette was picked to finish first in the Sun Belt Conference with 98 votes and 8 first place votes.

Preseason All-Sun Belt team
Devin Brown (USA, SO, Pitcher)
Randi Rupp (TXST, SO, Pitcher)
Lexi Elkins (ULL, SR, Catcher)
Kelsey Vincent (ULL, SR, 1st Base)
Haley Hayden (ULL, JR, 2nd Base)
DJ Sanders (ULL, SO, Shortstop)
Emily Messer (USA, SR, 3rd Base)
Stephanie Pilkington (USA, SR, Outfielder)
Shellie Landry (ULL, SR, Outfielder)
Rochelle Roberts (ULM, JR, Outfield)
Mya Anderson (UTA, SR, Designated Player)
Ivie Drake (GSU, SO, At-Large)
Kendall Wiley (TXST, SR, At-Large)
Taylor Anderson (GSU, SR, At-Large)
Taylor Rogers (GASO, JR, At-Large)

Preseason Student-Athlete of the Year
Lexie Elkins (ULL, SR, Catcher)'

Roster

Coaching staff

Schedule and results

Lafayette Regional

Norman Super Regional

References

Louisiana
Louisiana Ragin' Cajuns softball seasons
Louisiana softball